Neville Chapman (15 September 1941 – 14 October 1993) was an English footballer who made 85 appearances in the Football League playing as a full back for  Middlesbrough and Darlington in the 1960s.

Chapman was the first Middlesbrough player to be substituted after the rule permitting in-game replacements was introduced to the Football League in 1965. He was replaced by Bryan Orritt in the match against Preston North End on 11 September 1965.

References

1941 births
1993 deaths
People from Cockfield, County Durham
Footballers from County Durham
English footballers
Association football defenders
Middlesbrough F.C. players
Darlington F.C. players
English Football League players
Place of death missing